Jonathan Bell (born August 26, 1997) is an American professional soccer player who plays as a defender for Major League Soccer club St. Louis City SC.

Career

New England Revolution II
Bell was selected with the 38th overall pick of the 2020 MLS SuperDraft by the San Jose Earthquakes. In July 2020, he was signed by USL League One club New England Revolution II. He made his debut for the club on July 25, 2020 against Union Omaha.

New England Revolution
On March 22, 2021, Bell signed a first-team contract with New England Revolution.

St. Louis City SC
On November 11, 2022, he was selected by St. Louis City SC during 2022 MLS Expansion Draft.

Career statistics

Club

Honors
New England Revolution
Supporters' Shield: 2021

References

External links
Jonathan Bell at UMBC Athletics

1997 births
Living people
American soccer players
Association football defenders
New England Revolution players
New England Revolution II players
National Premier Soccer League players
People from Silver Spring, Maryland
San Jose Earthquakes draft picks
Soccer players from Maryland
Sportspeople from Montgomery County, Maryland
UMBC Retrievers men's soccer players
USL League One players
USL League Two players
Major League Soccer players